Powerview-Pine Falls is a town in the Canadian province of Manitoba, with a population of 1,314 at the 2011 census, up 1.54% from 1,294 at the 2006 census and down 7.57% from 1,400 during the 2001 census.

The town is an amalgamation of the previous town of Powerview with the previously unincorporated area of Pine Falls, to its west. The town borders the Rural Municipality of Alexander and the Sagkeeng First Nation Indian reserve. Manitoba Highway 11 and Manitoba Provincial Road 304 are the major roads connecting Powerview with other nearby communities.

History 
The community was created as a paper mill town in the mid 1920s as Manitoba Pulp and Paper Company. The company was sold to Abitibi Paper Company and became Pine Falls Paper Group in 1995 after employee buyout; finally, it sold to Tembec in 1998.

In 2009, Tembec shut down the mill for good and the site was demolished by 2012, but the mill's footprint next to Slasher Bay is still visible. The mine was served by Canadian National Railway since 1924 and ended after the mill closed.

The current-day town of Powerview-Pine Falls came as result of an amalgamation of the previous town of Powerview with the previously unincorporated area of Pine Falls, to its west.

Demographics 

Employment

With the closure of the paper mill, the Pine Falls Hospital (Pine Falls Health Complex) of the Interlake-Eastern Regional Health Authority is the community's largest employer.

Climate
Pine Falls has a hemiboreal humid continental climate (Köppen Dfb), with short, warm summers and severely cold, snowy winters.

References

External links

Towns in Manitoba
Urban municipalities in Eastman Region, Manitoba